was a Japanese domain of the Edo period.  It was associated with Izumo Province in modern-day Shimane Prefecture.

In the han system, Matsue was a political and economic abstraction based on periodic cadastral surveys and projected agricultural yields.  In other words, the domain was defined in terms of kokudaka, not land area. This was different from the feudalism of the West.

History

The domain was controlled from what is now Matsue Castle in Matsue, Shimane.

List of daimyōs 
The hereditary daimyō were head of the clan and head of the domain.

Horio clan, 1600–1633 (tozama; 240,000 koku)

Horio Yoshiharu
Horio Tadauji 
Horio Tadaharu

Kyōgoku clan, 1634–1637 (tozama; 240,000 koku)

Kyōgoku Tadataka

Matsudaira (Echizen) clan, 1638–1871 (shinpan; 186,000 koku)
Matsudaira Naomasa
Matsudaira Tsunataka
Matsudaira Tsunachika
Matsudaira Yoshitō
Matsudaira Nobuzumi
Matsudaira Munenobu
Matsudaira Harusato
Matsudaira Naritsune
Matsudaira Naritoki
Matsudaira Sadayasu

Genealogy

 Tokugawa Ieyasu, 1st Tokugawa Shōgun (1543–1616; r. 1603–1605)
 Yūki Hideyasu,  1st Lord of Fukui (1574–1607)
  I. Matsudaira Naomasa, 1st Lord of Matsue (cr. 1638) (1601–1666; r. 1638–1666)
 II. Tsunataka, 2nd Lord of Matsue (1631–1675; r. 1666–1675)
 III. Tsunachika, 3rd Lord of Matsue (1659-1709; r. 1675-1704)
  IV. Yoshitō, 4th Lord of Matsue (1668–1705; r. 1704–1705)
  V. Nobuzumi, 5th Lord of Matsue (1698–1731; r. 1705–1731)
  VI. Munenobu, 6th Lord of Matsue (1729–1782; r. 1731–1767)
  VII. Harusatō, 7th Lord of Matsue (1751–1818; r. 1767–1806)
  VIII. Naritsune, 8th Lord of Matsue (1791–1822; r. 1806–1822)
  IX. Naritoki, 9th Lord of Matsue (1815–1863; r. 1822–1853)
 Chikayoshi, 1st Lord of Hirose (1632–1717)
 Chikatoki 2nd Lord of Hirose (1659–1702)
 Chikatomo, 3rd Lord of Hirose (1681–1728)
 Nagataka, 4th Lord of Tsuyama (1725–1762)
 Yasuchika, 5th Lord of Tsuyama (1752–1794)
 Naritaka, 7th Lord of Tsuyama (1788–1838)
  X. Sadayasu, 10th Lord of Matsue (1855–1882; Lord: 1853-1869; Governor: 1869–1871)
 Naoaki, 11th family head, 1st Count (1865–1940; 11th family head: 1882–1940; Count: cr. 1884)
 Tadakuni, 12th family head, 2nd Count (1902–1988; 12th family head: 1940–1988; 2nd Count: 1940–1947)
 Tadakoto, 13th family head (b. 1925; 13th family head: 1988–)
 Naotada (b. 1966)

See also 
 List of Han
 Abolition of the han system

References

External links
 "Matsue" at Edo 300 

Domains of Japan
Kyōgoku clan
Matsue-Matsudaira clan